Epsom Cricket Club is based at Epsom, Surrey, and was briefly a top-class team, first recorded in 1730 and playing top-class matches from 1814 to 1819. The current club is based at the Francis Schnadhorst Memorial ground in Woodcote Road, Epsom.

History
Epsom is first recorded in 1730, playing against Sunbury on Epsom Down. The 19th century club is first recorded on 28–29 July 1814 when it played Brighton at the Royal New Ground in Brighton. Brighton won by 10 wickets. The club's last known important match in 1819 was against Hampshire at Epsom Downs and they lost that by 135 runs.

References

Bibliography
 

Former senior cricket clubs
English cricket in the 19th century
Cricket clubs established in the 19th century
Cricket in Surrey
English club cricket teams